Syed Hafeezuddin is a Pakistani politician from Karachi who had been a Member of the Provincial Assembly of Sindh, from 2013 to 2018.

Political career 
Formerly the chief organizer for Pakistan Muslim League (N)'s Karachi division, he announced to join Pakistan Tehreek-e-Insaf on 14 February 2012.

He was elected to the Provincial Assembly of Sindh as a candidate of Pakistan Tehreek-e-Insaf from Constituency PS-93 (Karachi-V) in 2013 Pakistani general election.

Representing PTI, he also served as its provincial secretary general for Sindh.

He left PTI and joined Pak Sarzameen Party in April 2016.

He ran for the seat in Sindh Provincial Assembly as a candidate of PSP from Constituency PS-114 (Karachi West-III) in 2018 Pakistani general election but was unsuccessful.

References

Sindh MPAs 2013–2018
Living people
Sindhi people
Year of birth missing (living people)